Coenoptychus pulcher is a species of spider in the family Corinnidae, found in India and Sri Lanka.

References

Corinnidae
Spiders of the Indian subcontinent
Spiders described in 1885